Sehested is a Danish name, and may refer to:

People
 Christen Thomesen Sehested, Danish Admiral
 Christian Christophersen Sehested, Danish politician
 Christiane Sehested, Danish royal
 Hannibal Sehested (council president), Danish politician
 Hannibal Sehested (governor), Danish statesman
 Hilda Sehested, Danish composer
 Karen Sehested, Danish court official
 Ove Ramel Sehested (1757–1838), Danish statesman

Other
 Sehested Fjord, Greenland
 HDMS Sehested (P547), Danish ship

Danish-language surnames